Jaczków  a village in Poland located in Lower Silesian Voivodeship, in wałbrzyskim say, in the village commune Czarny Bor. The village is situated on the river Leske, in a valley located between the massif Trójgarbu and Krąglaka the north and the rocky mountains in the south.

Demography 

The village has about 489 inhabitants. Although the land in the village and municipality is primarily assigned for agriculture, agriculture accounts for just 20% of employment within the population. Most people work in industry and services in nearby Kamienna Góra and Walbrzych. The unemployment rate remains relatively high at around 25-30%.

Economy 

In the village there are 2 small shops, a sawmill, workshop and several car transport companies.

Transportation 
The village is situated on a rail route linking Jelenia Gora Wałbrzych and Wrocław. Currently this line is in a bad condition. Travel from Wroclaw to Witków nearby (97 km) takes around 2 and a half hours. Also, a network of municipal and county roads located within the miejscwości are in a bad state of repair. In the years 2009-2012 it was intended to express the construction of roads Szczecin - Lubawka to beja near fluent Jaczków (just above the road linking Gostków to Jaczków). For the purpose of road construction S3 plan to tunnel under the eastern part of the Massif Krąglaka, at the outlet location to which the emergence of the so-called travel service. ILO Jaczków, then the path will go right behind the village, where more than 300-meter valley Lesku wharf. In the period 2010-2013 is planned construction of sanitary sewers and the construction of the reservoir on the river przeciwpowodziowego Leska.

Points of interest 

 Church p.w. sub - Our Lady of Czestochowa from 1586 onwards
 Cemetery and Parish przykościelny
 Manor No 67
 Oficyna Dworska - Apartment in a team office court
 Team Obora court
 Park manor
 House No 68

Administration 

In the years 1975-1998, the town administratively belonged to the Wałbrzyskiego province.

Notable residents 
 Ernst Christoph von Nassau (1686—1755), Prussian general 
 Kazimierz Lipień - Polish wrestler
 Joseph Lipień - Polish wrestler

Gallery

References

Villages in Wałbrzych County